Wilanów is a district of Warsaw.

Wilanów may also refer to:
Wilanów Palace, a former royal residence 
Wilanów, Greater Poland Voivodeship (west-central Poland)
Wilanów, Świętokrzyskie Voivodeship (south-central Poland)
Wilanów, Lubusz Voivodeship (west Poland)